Ayyappan, also called Dharmasastha and Manikandan, is a Hindu deity popular in Southern India. He is considered to be the epitome of dharma, truth, and righteousness and is often called upon to obliterate evil.

Although devotion to Ayyappan has been prevalent earlier in South India, his popularity rose only in the late 20th century. According to Hindu theology, he is the son of Harihara (Vishnu in the form of Mohini, and Shiva). Ayyappan is also referred to as Ayyappa, Sastavu, Hariharasudhan, Manikandan, Shasta or Dharma Shasta and Sabarinath.

The iconography of Ayyappan depicts him as a handsome celibate (Brahmachari) deity doing yoga and as an epitome of Dharma, who wears a bell around his neck. In the Hindu tradition popular in the Western Ghats of India, he was born with the powers of Shiva and Vishnu to confront and defeat the shape-shifting evil Buffalo demoness Mahishi. He was raised by a childless royal couple Rajashekara pandiyan and Koperundevi, and grows up as a warrior yogi champion of ethical and dharmic living. In South Indian portrayals, Ayyappan images show him riding a tigress, but in some places such as Sri Lanka he is shown as riding a white elephant.

Ayyappan's popularity has grown in many parts of India, and the most prominent Ayyappan shrine is at Sabarimala, nestled in the hills of Pathanamthitta of Kerala. The shrine receives millions of pilgrims every year in late December and early January, many of whom prepare for weeks before and then climb the hill barefoot, making it one of the largest active pilgrimage sites in the world. The pilgrimage attracts a wide range of devotees, from diverse social or economic backgrounds, except women in their fertile age because Ayyappan is believed to be a celibate deity. He remains one of the few deities in Hindu tradition, who is respected by other religious communities, including Muslims and Christians in Kerala. The most significant festival linked to him is the Makaravilakku (Makara Sankranti), observed around the winter solstice.

Names and iconography

The name Ayyappan (sometimes spelled as Ayyappa or Aiyappan) may be related to as "Lord Father". The name may literally come from "Ayyan" and "Appan" both meaning "Father". The root names "Ayyan" and "Appan" denotes Mohini (Mohini here called father, she is a female form of the god Vishnu) and Shiva respectively. However, the word Ayyappan is not found in South Indian versions of the medieval era Puranas, leading scholars to the hypothesis that Ayyappan may have roots elsewhere. The alternate theory links it to the Malayali word acchan and Tamil word appa which means "father", with Ayyappan connoting "Lord-father". The alternate proposal is supported by the alternate name for Ayyappan being Sastava (Sasta, Sashta, Sastra), a Vedic term that also means "Teacher, Guide, Lord, Ruler". The words Sastha and Dharmasastha in the sense of a Hindu god are found in the Puranas.

Ayyappan is also known as Hariharasudhan – meaning the "son of Harihara" or a fusion deity of Hari and Hara, the names given to Vishnu and Shiva respectively. He is also called Manikanta from Mani, Sanskrit for precious stone, and kanta, Sanskrit for neck. In some regions, Ayyappa and Ayyanar are considered to be the same deity given their similar origin. Others consider him as different because their worship methods are not the same.

Ayyappan is a warrior deity. He is revered for his ascetic devotion to Dharma – the ethical and right way of living, to deploy his military genius and daring yogic war abilities to destroy those who are powerful but unethical, abusive and arbitrary. His iconography is usually shown with a bow and arrow upraised in his left hand, while in his right he holds either a bow or a sword diagonally across his left thigh. Other depictions of Ayyappan, particularly paintings, generally show him in a yogic posture wearing a bell around his neck and sometimes shown riding a tiger.

Life and legends
The legends and mythology of Ayyappa varies across region like other Hindu gods and goddesses, reflecting a tradition that evolved and enriched over time, sometimes in conflicting ways. For example, the Sribhutanatha Purana text presents Ayyappan as an incarnation of the Hindu deity Hariharaputra, the son of Shiva and Mohini. This interaction between Shiva and Mohini is mentioned in the Bhagavata Purana, but Ayyappan is not mentioned. In the oral tradition as represented by Malayalam folk songs, Ayyappa is presented as a warrior hero of Pandala kingdom. According to Eliza Kent, the legends in the Ayyappa tradition seem to be "artificially mixed and assembled into a kind of collage". Ruth Vanita suggests that Ayyappan probably emerged from the fusion of a Dravidian god of tribal provenance and the Puranic story of Shiva and Mohini's interaction.

Core story

There once was a kingdom of Pandalam where Ayyappan originated. The royal family was childless. One day the king of Pandalam found a baby boy in a forest. The king carried the baby to an ascetic in the forest to inquire about the boy. The ascetic advised the king to take the baby home, raise him like his own son, and that in 12 years he would discover who the baby was. The royal family did so, naming the baby Manikantha.

At age 12, the king wanted to formally invest Manikantha as the heir prince (yuvraja). However, the queen under the influence of an evil minister objected. The minister had advised the queen that only her younger biological child should be the next king. The younger child was disabled and lacked the ability to perform the duties of the king, something that the scheming evil minister thought would make him the de facto ruler. The minister persuaded the queen to feign an illness, ask for "tiger's milk" to cure her illness and demand that Manikantha be sent to get the milk from the forest. Manikantha volunteers, goes into the forest, and returns riding a tigress. The king, realising Manikantha's special ability recognizes the adopted son to be a divine being, resolves to make a shrine for him. For the location, Manikantha shoots an arrow that lands thirty kilometers away. The young boy then transforms into Ayyappan. The place where arrow landed is now an Ayyappa shrine, a site of a major pilgrimage that is particularly popular for visits on Makara Sankranti (about January 14).

The above core story is shared wherever Ayyappan is revered in India. Sometimes the story is slightly different or extended, such as the younger son of the queen is not disabled, Ayyappan does bring tigress milk for the queen riding on a tiger, but after doing so Ayyappan renounces the kingdom, becomes an ascetic yogi and returns to live as a great warrior in the forested mountain.

Medieval interpretations

In the medieval age, the stories of Ayyappan expanded. One story has roots between the 1st and 3rd century CE, where Ayyappan evolves to be a deity who also protects traders and merchants from enemies such as robbers and plundering outlaws. Ayyappa came to be portrayed as a military genius. His temple and tradition inspired Hindu yogi mercenaries who protected the trade routes in South India from criminals and looters, restoring Dharmic trading practices.

In one of the stories, Ayyappan is portrayed as a child of a priest whose father was murdered by the fearsome outlaw Udayanan. The outlaw also kidnaps a princess. Ayyappan then makes a daring rescue, attacks and kills evil Udayanan. In another version of this story, the rulers of Pantalam themselves sent Ayyappan as a mercenary to the Pantya rulers to whom the ruler of Pantalam was related. In another late medieval era variation of the story, Ayyappan forms an alliance with the Muslim warrior Vavar against Udayanan, the basis for some devotees worshiping both in a mosque and then in the Hindu temple before starting a pilgrimage to Ayyappan shrine.

According to Paul Younger, supplementary legends appeared in the late medieval times that linked other Hindu deities and mythologies to Ayyappan heritage. One such story links Ayyappan to the buffalo-demon Mahishasura and buffalo-demoness Mahishasuri. The divine beings Datta and Lila came to earth as humans. Datta wanted to return to the divine realm, but Lila enjoyed her life on earth and Datta's company. She wanted to stay on earth. Datta became angry and cursed her to become a Mahishi, or water buffalo demoness. Lila in turn cursed him to become a Mahisha, or water buffalo demon. They plundered earth with their evil acts. The water buffalo demon Mahishasura was killed by goddess Durga, while the water demoness Mahishasuri was killed by Ayyapan, ending the terror of evil and liberating divine Lila who was previously cursed. These legends, states Younger, syncretically link and combine various Hindu traditions around Shiva (Shaivism), Vishnu (Vaishnavism) and Devi (Shaktism).

Temples 

There are many temples in Kerala whose presiding deity is Ayyappan, the most famous among them being the Sabarimala temple. Padinettam Padi Karuppan is Guardian Of Ayyappan temple. The temple attracts millions of visitors every year during mandala season from mid November to mid January. Other important temples are Kulathupuzha Sastha Temple, Aryankavu Sastha Temple, Achankovil Sree Dharmasastha Temple, Erumely Sree Dharmasastha Temple and Ponnambalamedu Temple.

Ayyappan temples typically show him as a celibate yogi. A few important temples such as the one at Achankovil Sree Dharmasastha Temple near Travancore, however, depict him as a married man with two wives Poorna and Pushkala, as well as a son Satyaka. Some of Ayyappan temples are believed to have been established by the Vishnu avatar Parashurama.

Sabarimala

Ayyappan has roots in Kerala, but his influence and popularity have grown among the Hindus in South Indian states. Of his many temples, the most significant is at Sabarimala (also spelled Sabarimalai), set in the forests of the Pathanamthitta district in the Western Ghats on the banks of river Pamba, southeast of Kottayam. It is a major pilgrimage, attracting millions of Hindus every year, particularly of Malayali, Tamil, Kannada and Telugu heritage.

Many begin preparations months in advance by leading a simple life, doing yoga, abstaining from sex, eating a vegetarian diet or partially fasting, wearing black or blue or sadhu-style dress for forty one days, then trekking as a group to the shrine. The group does not recognize any form of social or economic discrimination such as caste, and all devotees form a fraternity welcoming each other as equals. The pilgrims call each other by the same name during the trek: swami. After their long walk covering about 18 miles, they bathe in the Pamba river, then they climb 18 steps at the Sabarimala shrine, each representing a dharmic value (ethics, or interiorized gods). The shrine priests and devotees bring flowers from all over the Western Ghats and scatter them near the shrine, all the while chanting shlokas.

To keep the human traffic organized, Ayyappan devotees reserve and are assigned a pilgrimage day from one of the 51 days of pilgrimage, and each day sees over 100,000 walking pilgrims. Women of menstruating age (between the ages of 10-50) were strictly prohibited in the temple until 2018. This was said to be due to the belief that Lord Ayyappan is a Brahmachari (celibate) deity. The Supreme Court of India ruled on 28 September 2018 that women could not be prohibited from entering the temple. This led to violent protests.

The devotees wear simple dress on the day of the pilgrimage up the hills and through the forest, many go barefoot, carry irumudi (a walking stick for regional Hindu yogis with two compartment little bag sometimes carried on head), wear Tulasi leaves and Rudraksha beads around their neck (symbolism for Vishnu and Shiva) while fellow Hindus gather along the trek path, cheering and helping them complete their journey. For the Ayyappan pilgrims, states E. Valentine Daniel, the pilgrimage is a part of their spiritual journey.

Other religions

He is also revered by Muslims in Kerala due to his friendship with Vavar, who is identified as a Muslim brigand in local versions of the Ayyappan myth. In this mythology, Ayyappan confronts the plunder-driven pirate robber Vavar in the jungle on his way to collect tigress milk. They fight. Ayyappan defeats Vavar, and Vavar changes his way, becomes Ayyappan's trusted lieutenant helping fight other pirates and robbers. In another version, Vavar is stated to be a Muslim saint from Arabia, who works with Ayyappan.

A mosque dedicated to Ayyappan's lieutenant Vavar swami stands next to the Kadutha swami shrine at the foot of the pilgrimage path, both as a form of guardian deities. Some pilgrims offer a prayer to both, before beginning their Sabarimala forest and mountain pilgrimage hike. According to Kent, the mosque does not contain mortal remains of Vavar swami though the mosque near Sabarimala includes a grave, and no one can date Vavar nor provide when and where he lived, so he may be a myth. The Vavar legend and palli shrines may reflect the Hindu approach to accepting and co-opting legendary figures or saints of other religions within its fold.

Popular culture 
A number of Indian films have been made about the deity. These include: Sabarimala Ayyappan (1961) by S. M. Sriramulu Naidu, Swami Ayyappan (1975) by P. Subramaniam, Saranam Ayyappa (1980) by Dasarathan, Arul Tharum Ayyappan (1987) by Dasarathan, Shiv Putra Swami Ayappa (1990) by P.S. Mani, Sabarimala Sri Ayyappan (1990) by Renuka Sharma, Engal Swamy Ayyappan (1990) by Dasarathan, Ayyappa Swamy Mahatyam (1991), Ayyappa Deeksha Mahimalu (1992) by Guda Rama Krishna, Swami Ayappa Shabarimalai (1993) by K. Shankar, Jai Hari Hara Putra Ayyappa (1995), Bhagwaan Ayyappa (2007) by Irajaral Bhakhta and V. Swaminathan, Swami Ayyappan (2012) by Chetan Sharma and Mahesh Vettiyar, Om Sharanam Ayyappa (2015) by K. Sharath, Sri Omkara Ayyappane (2016) by Sai Prakash, Ayyappa Kataksham (2019) by Rudrapatla Venugopal.

The Indian television channel Asianet launched a Malayalam-language series named Swami Ayyappan in 2006, this was followed by Swami Ayyappan Saram (2010), Sabarimala Shri Dharmashasta (2012) and Sabarimala Swami Ayappan (2019). The 2021 movie The Great Indian Kitchen prominently features a family of devotees of Ayyappan. The 2023 movie Malikappuram features the journey of a 10-year old girl to Sabarimala.

The story of Ayyappa is dictated by Parvati to Ganesha in the Indian TV show on Sony TV, called Vighnaharta Ganesh.

See also

 Achankovil
 Alappancode
 Aranmula kottaram (Aranmula palace)
 Gurunathanmukadi
 Harihara
 Harivarasanam
 Maalikapurathamma
 Makara Jyothi
 Sabarimala
 Tazhamon Madom
 Temples of Kerala

References

Bibliography

External links
 

Hindu gods
Fertility gods
Regional Hindu gods